Prince Nikolaus Wilhelm of Nassau (20 September 1832 – 17 September 1905), was the only son of William, Duke of Nassau by his second wife Princess Pauline of Württemberg.

Marriage and issue

He married morganatically in London on 1 July 1868 with Natalia Alexandrovna Pushkina (Saint Petersburg, 4 June 1836 – Cannes, 23 March 1913). She was the youngest child of Alexander Sergeyevich Pushkin and his wife, Natalia Nikolayevna Goncharova, and a descendant of Abram Petrovich Gannibal and Petro Doroshenko, Hetman of Ukrainian Cossacks, in turn grandson of Mykhailo Doroshenko. She was divorced from Russian General Mikhail Leontievich von Dubelt, by whom she had a daughter. In 1868, Prince Nikolaus Wilhelm's sister Princess Helena of Nassau's husband George Victor, Prince of Waldeck and Pyrmont granted Natalia the title Countess von Merenberg.

They had three children: 
Countess Sophie von Merenberg (Geneva, 1 June 1868 – London, 14 September 1927); created Countess de Torby in 1891; married in Sanremo on 26 February 1891, Grand Duke Michael Mikhailovich of Russia (Peterhof Palace, Peterhof, 16 October 1861 – London, 26 April 1929) and had issue.
 Countess Alexandrine von Merenberg (Wiesbaden, 14 December 1869 – Buenos Aires, 29 September 1950); married in London in 1914 Argentine Don Maximo de Elia (1851 – Saint-Jean-de-Luz, 1929), no issue.
Count Georg Nikolaus von Merenberg (Wiesbaden, 13 February 1871 – Wiesbaden, 31 May 1948); married firstly on 12 May 1895 in Nice, Princess Olga Alexandrovna Yurievskaya (St. Petersburg, 8 November 1873 – Wiesbaden, 10 August 1925), daughter of Alexander II of Russia and his morganatic second wife, Princess Ekaterina Mikhailovna Dolgorukova, and had issue; married, secondly, on 2 January 1930 in Wiesbaden, Adelheid Moran-Brambeer (Wiesbaden, 18 October 1875 – Zürich, 12 May 1942), no issue.
Count Alexander Adolf Nikolaus von Merenberg (Hannover, 16 September 1896 – Hannover, 20 December 1897).
Count Georg Michael Alexander von Merenberg (Hannover, 16 October 1897 – Mainz, 11 January 1965); married firstly in Budapest on 7 January 1926, Paulette Kövér de Gyergyó-Szent-Miklós, divorced in 1928, no issue; married secondly in Schroda on 27 July 1940, Elisabeth Anne Müller Uri (Wiesbaden, 1 July 1903 – Wiesbaden, 18 November 1963), and had issue: 
Countess Elisabeth Clothilde von Merenberg (b. Wiesbaden, 14 May 1941); married in Wiesbaden on 25 May 1965 Enno von Rintelen (b. Berlin, 9 November 1921 - 16 October 2013), and had issue: 
Alexander Enno von Rintelen (b. Wiesbaden, 23 March 1966).
Georg Nikolaus von Rintelen (b. Wiesbaden, 29 June 1970); married on 30 May 2007 Olivia Minninger (b. Köln, 27 August 1969), and had issue:
Julian von Rintelen (b. 7 January 2003) 
Nicolai von Rintelen (b. München, 17 November 2006)
Gregor von Rintelen (b. Wiesbaden, 13 August 1972); married in 2002 Countess Christiane von Bentheim-Tecklenburg-Rheda-Prill (b. Wiesbaden, 18 May 1973), and had issue:
Frederick von Rintelen (b. 11 December 2006)
Countess Olga Katharina Adda von Merenberg (Wiesbaden, 3 October 1898 – Bottmingen bei Basel, 15 September 1983); married in Wiesbaden on 14 November 1923 Count Michael Loris-Melikov (Tsarskoye Selo, 16 June 1900 – Bottmingen, 2 October 1980), and had issue: 
Count Alexander Loris-Melikov (b. Paris, 26 May 1926); married in Soignies on 27 September 1958 Micheline Prunier (b. Liège, 21 June 1932), and had issue: 
Countess Ann Elisabeth Loris-Melikova (b. Basel, 23 July 1959); married in Therwil on 4 November 1983 Marc Moos (b. 5 February 1953), and had issue:
Alain Moos (b. Basel, 26 March 1984).
Countess Dominique Loris-Melikova (b. Basel, 24 March 1961).
Countess Nathalie Loris-Melikova (b. Basel, 28 December 1963); married in Küssnacht on 9 October 1996 Johan Dierbach (b. Stockholm, 12 January 1963), and had issue: 
Sophie Dierbach (b. Zürich, 23 February 1997).
Count Michael Loris-Melikov (b. Basel, 18 December 1964); unmarried with no issue.

Honours and awards

Ancestry

References

1832 births
1905 deaths
House of Nassau-Weilburg
Generals of Infantry (Prussia)
Recipients of the Iron Cross (1870), 2nd class
Sons of monarchs